The discography of Chihiro Onitsuka consists of six studio albums, one cover album, five compilation albums, 20 singles and seven video albums. These were released under Toshiba EMI between 2000 and 2003, Universal Music Japan from 2004 to 2010, For Life Music Entertainment from 2011 to 2012, and on her personal record label, Napoleon Records, from 2013.

Albums

Studio albums

Live album

Cover album

Compilation albums

Singles

Promotional singles

Video albums

Music video collections

Live concerts

Notes

References

Discographies of Japanese artists
Pop music discographies